is a private university in Nara, Japan.  
Tezukayama University has two campuses—one in Gakuen-mae (学園前) in Nara city, and the other in eastern Ikoma (東生駒).  Tezukayama University has many facilities in a historical setting.

History
Tezukayama Gakuen was founded with an ideal of creating a new college town in Nara in celebration of Osaka's Tezukayama Gakuin 25th anniversary in 1941.

In 1961, Tezukayama Women's Junior College was established with two departments, the Department of Arts and Literature and the Department of Family and Consumer Science. In 1964, Tezukayama University was established as a woman's college with the Faculty of Liberal Arts. In 1982, the Tezukayama Archaeological Research Institute was founded (from 1997, reorganized as Research Institute for Archaeology).

Tezukayama University was changed to co-education in 1987 with establishing a more faculty, the Faculty of Economics. In 1991, the Graduate School of Economics was established, and in 1993, the doctoral degree program in Economics was established. After that, other faculties and graduate schools were established, such as the Graduate School of Humanities in 1996.

The Graduate School of Humanities at Tezukayama University is notable in the studies of Traditional Japanese Culture. Both M.A. and Ph.D. degrees are offered by this program. The Ph.D. programs in Law and Policy and Psychology were launched in 2003 and 2012, respectively.

Women's junior college

 was a private junior college associated with Tezukayama University. The junior college opened in April 1961 by Tezukayama Gakuen Education Group as a women's college. The junior college was affiliated with Tezukayama University from 1964 to 2005. It closed in 2005.

Organization

Colleges
Humanities
Department of Japanese Cultural Studies
Department of English Communication
Economics
Department of Economics
Business Administration
Department of Business Administration
Law
Department of Law
Psychology
Department of Psychology
Department of Family and Community Welfare
Contemporary Human Life Science
Department of Food and Nutrition
Department of Living Space Design
Department of Child Studies

Graduate school
Humanities
Traditional Japanese Culture (Doctoral Program)
Economics
Economics (Doctoral Program)
Law and Policy
Law and Policy (Doctoral Program)
Psychology
Psychology (Doctoral Program)

Research institutes
Research Institute for Archeology
Research Institute for Economics and Business
Institute of Comprehensive Nara Cultural Studies
Human Environmental Science Research Institute

Other institutes
Institute for Mental Support
The Museum of Tezukayama University

Notable faculty members
Ryoyu Uchiyama (Theoretical physics)
Kazuo Fujita (Earth Scientice)
Michio Hatanaka (Econometrics)
Chikashi Moriguchi (Economics)
Takashi Inukai (Japanese literature)

List of partner universities

China 
 Beijing Language and Culture University
 Shanghai Normal University

New Zealand 
 Christchurch Polytechnic Institute of Technology

South Korea 
 Dongseo University
 Kyungnam College of Information and Technology

Spain 
 Universidad de Valladolid

United Kingdom 
 University of Leeds

United States 
 The University of Maine
 University of Mount Union
 Guilford College
 Manhattanville College
 Portland State University

References

External links
 Official website
 Official website

Universities and colleges in Nara Prefecture
Private universities and colleges in Japan
1961 establishments in Japan
Kansai Collegiate American Football League